The Arizona/New Mexico Mountains ecoregion is a Level III ecoregion designated by the United States Environmental Protection Agency (EPA) in the U.S. states of Arizona and New Mexico.

Description
The region is a transition region from the lower elevation Sonoran Desert (81) to the southwest and Chihuahuan Desert (24) southeast; the west is bordered by the mid-elevation Mojave Desert (14).

The north is bordered by the east–west Arizona/New Mexico Plateau (22), ecoregion which is part of and is the southern region of the Colorado Plateau. The north region of the Colorado Plateau covers eastern Utah/western Colorado and is the Colorado Plateaus (ecoregion) (20). The extreme southern perimeter of the Colorado Plateaus ecoregion extends east–west along the border regions of Arizona-New Mexico.

Arizona section
The Arizona section is bordered on the north, and center by regions of the Mogollon Rim, extending on the east into western New Mexico. It is named the Arizona transition zone and contains the following mountains:

Central mountain ranges

 Black Hills (Yavapai County)
 Dripping Springs Mountains
 Limestone Hills (Arizona)
 Mazatzal Mountains
 New River Mountains
 Sierra Ancha
 Superstition Mountains
 Usery Mountains

Western region ranges

 Aquarius Mountains
 Black Hills (Yavapai County)
 Black Mountains (Yavapai County)
 Bradshaw Mountains
 Date Creek Mountains
 Hieroglyphic Mountains
 Juniper Mountains
 McCloud Mountains
 Mohon Mountains
 Poachie Range
 (Alamo Lake, Aguila Valley)
 Santa Maria Mountains
 Sierra Prieta
 Sullivan Buttes
 Vulture Mountains
 Weaver Mountains

Eastern region ranges

 Big Lue Mountains
 Black Hills (Greenlee County)
 Blackjack Mountains
 Gila Mountains (Graham County)
 Hayes Mountains
 Mescal Mountains, Arizona
 Natanes Mountains
 Pinal Mountains
 Salt River Mountains (Gila County)
 Santa Teresa Mountains
 Sevenmile Mountains, Arizona
 Sierra Aguilada-(New Mexico)
 White Mountains (Arizona)-(central-southern regions)

In Arizona, two outlier regions are also considered as part of the ecoregion, the Kaibab Plateau, (the North Rim of the Grand Canyon), and the Chuska Mountains region of the northeast of Northern Arizona.

New Mexico section
The New Mexico section contains the mountain ranges that extend eastwards into western New Mexico from the Arizona transition zone. The White Mountains subregion of eastern Arizona is a high altitude area extending into about ten ranges of western-(central) New Mexico, and west of the Rio Grande. East of the Rio Grande and extending southeast is a monolithic section of mountains, mostly the Sacramento Mountains but extending southeast into the Guadalupe Mountains.

In the central-north, east of the Rio Grande another monolithic section is made of the Sandia-Manzano Mountains. West of the Rio Grande extending northwest towards the Chuskas, on the Arizona-New Mexico border, are other outlier ranges considered part of the Arizona/New Mexico Mountains ecosystem.

See also
 List of mountain ranges of Arizona
 List of mountain ranges of New Mexico
 Ecoregions defined by the EPA and the Commission for Environmental Cooperation:
 List of ecoregions in North America (CEC)
 List of ecoregions in the United States (EPA)
 The conservation group World Wildlife Fund maintains an alternate classification system:
 List of ecoregions (WWF)
 List of ecoregions in the United States (WWF)

References

Ecoregions of the United States

Regions of Arizona
Regions of New Mexico